Proctalgia fugax, a variant of levator ani syndrome, is a severe, episodic pain in the regions of the rectum and anus. It can be caused by cramping of the levator ani muscle, particularly in the pubococcygeal part.

Signs and symptoms

It most often occurs in the middle of the night and lasts from seconds to minutes; pain and aching lasting twenty minutes or longer would likely be diagnosed instead as levator ani syndrome. In a study published in 2007 involving 1809 patients, the attacks occurred in the daytime (33 percent) as well as at night (33 percent) and the average number of attacks was 13. Onset can be in childhood; however, in multiple studies the average age of onset was 45. Many studies showed that women are affected more commonly than men, but this can be at least partly explained by men's reluctance to seek medical advice concerning rectal pain. Data on the number of people affected vary, but prevalence may be as high as 8–18%. It is thought that only 17–20% of patients consult a physician, so obtaining accurate data on occurrence presents a challenge.

During an episode, the patient feels spasm-like, sometimes excruciating, pain in the rectum or anus, often misinterpreted as a need to defecate. To be diagnosed as proctalgia fugax, the pain must arise de novo (meaning the absence of clear cause). As such, pain associated with constipation (either chronic, or acute), penetrative anal intercourse, trauma (such as tears or fissures of the rectal sphincter or anal canal), side-effects of some medications (particularly opiates), or rectal foreign body insertion preclude this diagnosis.  The pain episode subsides by itself as the spasm disappears on its own, but may reoccur.

Because of the high incidence of internal anal sphincter thickening with the disorder, it is thought to be a disorder of that muscle or that it is a neuralgia of pudendal nerves. It is not known to be linked to any disease process.

Prevention
High-voltage pulsed galvanic stimulation (HGVS) has been shown to be of prophylactic benefit, to reduce the incidence of attacks. The patient is usually placed in the left lateral decubitus position and a sterile probe is inserted into the anus. The negative electrode is used and the stimulator is set with a pulse frequency of 80 to 120 cycles per second.  The voltage (intensity) is started at 0, progressively raised to a threshold of patient discomfort, and then is decreased to a level that the patient finds comfortable. As the patient's tolerance increases, the voltage can be gradually increased to 250 to 350 Volts. Each treatment session usually lasts between 15 and 60 minutes. Several studies have reported short-term success rates that ranged from 65 to 91%.

A low dose of oral diazepam taken at night may be of benefit for frequent or disabling attacks.

Treatment
For milder cases, simple reassurance and topical treatment with a calcium channel blocker such as diltiazem, or nifedipine ointment, salbutamol inhalation and topical nitroglycerine. For persistent cases, local anesthetic blocks, clonidine or botulinum toxin injections can be considered. Supportive treatments directed at aggravating factors include high-fiber diet, withdrawal of drugs which have gut effects (e.g., drugs that provoke or worsen constipation including narcotics and oral calcium channel blockers; drugs that provoke or worsen diarrhea including quinidine, theophylline, and antibiotics), warm baths, rectal massage, perineal strengthening exercises, anticholinergic agents, non-narcotic analgesics, sedatives or muscle relaxants such as diazepam. In patients who have frequent, severe, prolonged attacks, inhaled salbutamol has been shown in some studies to reduce their duration.

Traditional remedies have ranged from cannabis suppositories, warm baths (if the pain lasts long enough), warm to hot enemas, and relaxation techniques.

References

External links 

 PatientPlus

Diseases of intestines